Court Square Capital Partners is a private equity firm focused on leveraged buyout transactions.  Court Square was originally a captive private equity firm within Citigroup known as Citigroup Venture Capital Equity Partners. Court Square's investment professionals have invested over $4.5 billion in more than 150 transactions, which have returned $14 billion to date.

Court Square is headquartered in New York City and was spun out of Citigroup in 2006.  The firm is named after the location of Citigroup's offices at One Court Square in Queens.

History

March 2015 Court Square Capital acquired Research Now.

Court Square currently manages approximately $8.2 billion of investor commitments. 

The firm's predecessor Citicorp Venture Capital Equity Partners traces its roots to 1968 with the founding of Citicorp Venture Capital.  In the 1980s, CVC Equity Partners began to focus primarily on leveraged buyout transactions.

The spin out of Court Square came at the same time as the spin outs of private equity groups from other leading investment banks including: JPMorgan Chase (CCMP Capital), Morgan Stanley (Metalmark Capital), Deutsche Bank (MidOcean Partners) and Credit Suisse First Boston (Avista Capital Partners, Diamond Castle Holdings).

In 2008, Citigroup sold off the bulk of its $400 million of interests in legacy Court Square investment funds to secondary investors AlpInvest Partners and Goldman Sachs.

References

 Moore, Heidi.  Court Square fundraising tops rivals DowJones Financial News, July 13, 2007
 Moore, Heidi.  Banks look to outsourced management DowJones Financial News, September 25, 2006
 "Group to Buy MacDermid for $1.3 Billion", Reuters, December 16, 2006
 "CITIGROUP UNIT AGREES TO BUY REST OF DELCO REMY." The New York Times, February 8, 2001
 Carr, David. "Citigroup Unit Buys Real Estate Publications." The New York Times, January 10, 2005

External links
Court Square Capital Partners (company website)

Financial services companies established in 1968
Private equity firms of the United States
Investment banking private equity groups
Citigroup